Lloyd McGuire (born 2 September 1947) is an English actor in film and television.

Education
Born in Birmingham, Warwickshire, McGuire attended Bournville Grammar-Technical School for Boys. He began work as a Commercial Apprentice at the Austin Motor Company in Birmingham in 1964 and toyed with developing a career as a footballer (even playing in King Norton's League and for Alvechurch second team). He became disillusioned with both football and life at "the Austin" and, after watching a Michael Caine film, declared he was going to be an actor. He was encouraged by his apprentice supervisor and gained entry to drama school.

While training to be a British Leyland salesman, McGuire made the move to become an actor. Introduced to the Alvechurch Amateur Dramatic Society, he did some work at Crescent Theatre before being trained at the Birmingham College of Speech and Drama.

Career
His most popular role was that of Bob in the Channel 4 TV series Teachers but he has also appeared in many TV programmes over the last few decades such as Coronation Street, Juliet Bravo, Midsomer Murders and so on. He has often played policemen, including the role of Sgt. Calder on the second series of Prime Suspect, recurring appearances as DS Bernie Duckworth in Juliet Bravo, and multiple characters in The Bill. Other TV show appearances include Bergerac, Boon, Birds of a Feather, Casualty, Doctors, Heartbeat, Holby City, Inspector Morse, Jonathan Creek, Lovejoy and Agatha Christie's Poirot.

In 2010, he played the Master of Ceremonies in Chris Shepherd's award winning film Bad Night for the Blues.

In 2013, he appeared as Valco boss Martin Shell in the third series of Sky One's Trollied.

On stage, McGuire appeared has performed in Scotland and at the Everyman Theatre, Cheltenham before joining the Royal Shakespeare Company with appearances at Aldwych Theatre and Stratford-upon-Avon, as well as Richard II in New York.

References

External links
 
 Lloyd McGuire at Theatricalia

Living people
English male film actors
English male television actors
1947 births
People from Birmingham, West Midlands
Alumni of Birmingham School of Acting
Royal Shakespeare Company members